"Is It Love" is a song by Dutch Eurodance group Twenty 4 Seven, released in November 1993, as the fourth single from their second studio album, Slave To The Music (1993). It was the first up-tempo song written by Ruud van Rijen and scored success on the charts in Europe, peaking at number five in Germany. The chorus is sung by Nancy Coolen while the rap parts are performed by Stay-C.

Chart performance
"Is It Love" was a major hit on the charts across several continents and remains one of the group's most successful songs to date. In Europe, it made it to the top 10 in Austria, Belgium, Denmark, Germany (number five), the Netherlands, Portugal (number four) and Sweden. On the Eurochart Hot 100 and in Iceland, it peaked at number eleven. It didn't chart on the UK Singles Chart. Outside Europe, the single charted at number eight in Zimbabwe, and number 20 in both Australia and New Zealand. It earned a gold record in Germany, with a sale of 250,000 singles.

Critical reception
Maria Jimenez from Music & Media described "Is It Love" as a "sugar-coated highly commercial track".

Music video
The partially black-and-white music video for "Is It Love" was released in December 1993 by Garcia Media Production. It was videoed by Fernando Garcia and Steve Walker, and filmed in Belgium and the Netherlands. The video was A-listed on Germany's VIVA and was later published on Arcade's official YouTube channel in April 2013. By September 2020, it had generated more than 3,2 million views.

Track listing

 CD single (Netherlands) - Indisc
 "Is It Love" — 3:56
 "Is It Love" (Dancability Club Mix) — 5:04

 CD single (Netherlands) - Indisc
 "Is It Love" (Single Mix) — 3:56
 "Is It Love" (Dancability Club Mix) — 5:04
 "Slave to the Music" (Naked Eye Remix) — 5:53
 "Is It Love" (RVR Long Version) — 5:30

 CD single (Australia & New Zealand) - Possum
 "Is It Love" (Single Mix) — 3:56
 "Is It Love" (Dancability Club Mix) — 5:04
 "Slave to the Music" (Naked Eye Remix) — 5:53
 "Is It Love" (RVR Long Version) — 5:30

 CD single (Scandinavia) - Scandinavian Records
 "Is It Love" (Single Mix) — 3:56
 "Is It Love" (Dancability Club Mix) — 5:04
 "Slave to the Music" (Naked Eye Remix) — 5:53
 "Is It Love" (RVR Long Version) — 5:30

 CD maxi (Germany) - ZYX Music 
 "Is It Love" (Single Mix) — 3:56
 "Is It Love" (Dancability Club Mix) — 5:04
 "Slave to the Music" (Naked Eye Remix) — 5:53
 "Is It Love" (RVR Long Version) — 5:30

 CD mini (Japan) - Cutting Edge
 "Is It Love" (Single Mix) — 3:56
 "Slave to the Music" (Naked Eye Remix) — 5:53
 "Is It Love" (Dancability Club Mix) — 5:04
 "Slave to the Music" (Ferry & Garnefski Club Mix) — 5:02

Charts

Weekly charts

Year-end charts

Certifications

References

1993 singles
1993 songs
Songs written by Ruud van Rijen
Twenty 4 Seven songs
ZYX Music singles